IATA codes are abbreviations that the International Air Transport Association (IATA) publishes to facilitate air travel. They are typically 1, 2, 3, or 4 character combinations (referred to as unigrams, digrams, trigrams, or tetragrams, respectively) that uniquely identify locations, equipment, companies, and times to standardize international flight operations. All codes within each group follow a pattern (same number of characters, and using either all letters or letter/digit combinations) to reduce the potential for error.

Airport codes 

IATA airport codes are trigram letter designations for airports, like "ORY" (Paris-Orly Airport),  "CPT" (Cape Town International Airport), OTP (Otopeni International Airport) and "BCN" (Barcelona-El Prat).

Airline designators 

IATA airline designators are digram letter/digit codes for airline companies, like "M6" (Amerijet), "NH" (All Nippon Airways), and "4A" (Air Kiribati).

Aircraft type designators 

IATA aircraft type designators are trigram letter/digit codes used for aircraft models, like "J41" (British Aerospace Jetstream 41) and "744" (Boeing 747-400).

Country codes 
Digram letter codes are used for countries as specified in ISO 3166-1 alpha-2. One additional code is used:
 code XU is used to specify part of Russia east of (but not including) the Ural Mountains.

Currency codes 
Trigram letter codes are used for currencies as specified in ISO 4217.

IATA time zone codes 
IATA time zone is a country or a part of a country, where local time is the same. IATA time zone code is constructed of 2–4 characters (letters and digits) as follows:
 ISO 3166-1 alpha-2 country code is always used as first and second characters of time zone code.
 If country is not divided into separate time zones – no more characters added. Just 2 characters used.
 If country is divided into time zones – 3rd character of time zone code is a digit – number of time zone in country. Note: Russia is divided into 11 time zones, so number of time zone in country is specified by 2 digits – RU01, RU02, ... RU11.
 If some territories have the same local time, but different rules on daylight saving time – a letter can be added as 4th character to make unique codes for all such territories. 

Example: Time zone code AU2 is used for Australian states New South Wales and Victoria (local time is UTC + 10 hours, DST begins at end of October). Time zone code AU2A is used for Tasmania (local time is UTC + 10 hours, DST begins at end of September). Time zone code AU2B is used for Queensland (local time is UTC + 10 hours, no DST).

IATA region codes 
IATA region codes trigram letters codes used to specify large territories, consisting of several countries.

Following codes are used:

 AFR - Africa
 CAR - Caribbean sea countries
 CEM - Central America
 EUR - Europe
 TC1 - IATA American Traffic Conference (includes NOA, CEM, SOA and CAR)
 TC3 - IATA Asian Traffic Conference (includes JAK, SAS, SEA, SWP)
 TC2 - IATA European and African Traffic Conference (includes AFR, EUR, MDE)
 JAK - Japan and Korea
 MDE - Middle East
 NOA - North America
 SCH - Schengen agreement countries
 SOA - South America
 SAS - South Asia
 SEA - South-Eastern Asia
 SWP - South-West Pacific

Speaking on region codes and countries, country code RU is used to specify part of Russia west from (and including of) Ural Mountains and country code XU is used to specify part of Russia east from (and not including of) Ural Mountains. Country RU is in EUR region, country XU is in SEA region. For all other purposes only country code RU is used to specify all the territory of Russia.

Country code AQ is used to specify Antarctica. Country AQ is not in any of regions listed here.

IATA meal codes 
IATA Cabin Operations Safety Best Practices Guide - 19.7 Special Meals  defines the following standard meal codes:

 AVML - Asian Vegetarian Meal
 BBML - Baby Meal
 BLML - Bland Meal
 CHML - Child Meal
 DBML - Diabetic Meal
 FPML - Fruit Platter Meal
 GFML - Gluten Intolerant Meal
 HNML - Hindu Meal
 KSML - Kosher Meal
 LCML - Low-Calorie Meal 
 LSML - Low Sodium Meal
 MOML - Muslim Meal
 NLML - Non-Lactose Meal
 RVML - Raw Vegetarian Meal
 LFML - Low Fat Meal
 SFML - Seafood Meal
 VGML - Vegan Meal
 VJML - Vegetarian Jain Meal
 VLML - Vegetarian Lacto-ovo Meal
 VOML - Vegetarian Oriental Meal

Codes used by other airlines include:

 ALML - Allergen Meal
 CLML - Celebration Cake Meal
 HFML - High Fibre Meal
 OBML - Japanese Obento Meal (on United Airlines)
 JPML - Japanese Meal (on Japan Airlines)
 JNML - Junior Meal
 KSMLS - Kosher Meal (Snack)
 NBML - No Beef Meal (on China Airlines)
 NFML - No Fish Meal (on Lufthansa)
 LPML - Low Protein Meal
 PRML - Low Purin Meal
 ORML - Oriental Meal
 PFML - Peanut Free Meal
 SPML - Special Meal, Specify Food

Name class codes 
The trigram is composed of the first letter of first name and the first two letters of the names (ISO 9625)

IATA class codes 

IATA class codes are 1-letter codes created to help airlines standardize conditions of travel on passenger tickets and other traffic documents.

IATA tax codes 

List of ticket and airport tax codes:

 AB - Government Tax
 AC - Value Added Tax
 AE - Passenger Service Charge (International)
 AF - Airport Departure Fee (Domestic/International)
 AG - Ticket Tax
 AH - Airport Tax
 AI - Baggage Security Screening Fee
 AJ - Airport Exit Tax (International)
 AK - Airport Departure Tax (International)
 AL - Passenger Service Charge (Domestic/International)

See also 
ICAO airport code
List of IATA-indexed railway stations

Notes

References
 IATA Cabin Operations Safety Best Practices Guide - 19.7 Special Meals 
 Airports and airlines IATA codes  list

Encodings
International Air Transport Association